Kayamkulam Kochunni is a 2018 Indian Malayalam-language period action film directed by Rosshan Andrrews and written by Bobby & Sanjay. It is based on the life of Kayamkulam Kochunni, a famed highwayman who robbed from the rich and gave to the poor during the British Raj in the early 19th century Central Travancore. The film stars Nivin Pauly in the title role along with Mohanlal, Sunny Wayne and Babu Antony in supporting roles.

Principal photography commenced on 30 September 2017 in Udupi, Karnataka and was completed on 1 June 2018. 

Kayamkulam Kochunni was released on 11 October 2018 met with a positive critical response and was well received at the box office, becoming the highest-grossing Malayalam film of the year.

Plot 
  
At the start, a messenger tells the people of Kayamkulam that Kayamkulam Kochunni, a famed Mappila highwayman of the area, will be executed by hanging. The story then moves into a flashback.

Baputty, Kochunni's father, is a famed poor thief who struggles to look after his family. One time he gets caught and is beaten up by the local Brahmins in front of Kochunni, who was a young boy at the time. His mother, not wanting him to grow up in abject poverty and suffering the same fate as his father, persuades him to leave home, so Kochunni leaves. He ends up in the house of a local Brahmin landlord and works as an employee in one of the landlord's shops.

The film fast-forwards and Kochunni is now an adult. During his time there, Kochunni sees Janaki, a Hindu lower-caste girl who is a servant, and falls in love with her, also learning from her that Thangal, a state-renowned fight master, has opened a school to train students in martial art. After jumping into a well and wrestling with a large python to rescue a boy, he's awarded a medal of bravery by the local British officer and makes a wish that he wants to join in with the dance and celebrations in their local British fort, which the officer grants.

Kochunni goes to the school but is turned away by Thangal on the basis that, like his father, he might become an even bigger thief by learning the martial art. Janaki also confesses her love for him, and with her help, he learns it by sitting and watching the training on a tree next to the school. However, one day he gets caught by Thangal and he tests Kochunni by making him fight the best student at the school, Thananayik Keshava Kurup, which Kochunni wins. Thangal has a change of heart and promises to teach him believing that one day Kochunni will become his successor. Seeing this, Keshava gets angry and leaves the school, threatening Kochunni that they'll meet one day and he will get his revenge.

During a stormy journey from Kochi, Kochunni's beloved caretaker falls into the Kayamkulam Lake. While rescuing him, Kochunni sees a stash of gold at the bottom of the lake. Kochunni reports this to local Brahmin landlords and the Brahmins persuade him to get this gold to them in return for three wishes. He successfully gets the gold to them and they grant him one of the wishes, which was a bag of gold. However, their henchmen beat him up during his return and the Brahmins falsely accuse him on grounds of robbery and punish him by dipping his hand in boiling oil and hanging him upside down for four days. Janaki is then stoned and banished from Kayamkulam for loving a man from another caste much to Kochunni's dismay.

However, on the fourth day Ithikkara Pakki, one of the biggest thief of the place, known for ruthlessly beheading his enemies, comes and frees Kochunni, taking him to Pakki's hideout in the forest. There, he persuades Kochunni to take revenge against the Brahmins by stealing, and he agrees. He is then subjected to intense and hard training by Pakki and his gang of three thieves, Mammad, Kunju Marakkar and Noor Ahmed. He becomes a successful highwayman as well by carrying out robberies against several travelling Brahmins. They then rob several shops of Brahmins in the Kayamkulam market to show their power. Even though they rob many stores, Kochunni refuses to rob his ex-caretaker's store, telling him that he can't watch his beloved ones being attacked by others, unlike what he did when Kochunni was falsely accused by the landlords. One day Kochunni and his friends go to rob a Brahmin's house. They break a wall to go into the house and this woke up some of the Brahmins. Pakki, who saw this, kills some of them. Pakki and his friends enter a room filled with gold. However, the remaining Brahmins see this and try to lock Pakki in the room. Kochunni, seeing this goes to the Brahmin's room and takes the Brahmin's children, and runs away. The Brahmin, seeing this, asks his fellow Brahmins to leave Pakki and his friends to go save his daughter. The Brahmin chases after Kochunni to gain his children. Kochunni does not harm the children and drops them off so the parents can get them back easily. In this time Pakki escapes from the room.

Then it is the time for Pakki to leave the place. After Pakki leaves, Kochunni becomes the hero for the downtrodden, being a robber for the poor. Keshavan who is out to destroy Kochunni makes several plans to kill him but in vain. Finally he uses Janaki whom Kochunni loved earlier when he was a gentle man. However Kochunni killed the British General and is given the death sentence as he was cheated by his mates who joined Keshavan.

Back to the present, his capital punishment is fixed and at that time arrives Thangal, his former Kalari Master to see him in jail lastly. Kochunni and Thangal makes their sight useful by planning the way for Kochunni to escape. The procession for the hanging goes with song and martyrs. When Kochunni was about to be hanged, he uses his Kalari skills and after a struggling fight, he escapes with the help of Thangal.

At last in the present day, Kayamkulam Kochunni's tomb is shown.

Cast

 Nivin Pauly as Kayamkulam Kochunni
 Mohanlal as Ithikkara Pakki
 Sunny Wayne as Thananayik Keshava Kurup
 Babu Antony as Thangal
 Priya Anand as Janaki
 Priyanka Thimmesh as Suhara
 Shine Tom Chacko as Kochu Pillai
 Romanch Rajendran as Kunju Marakkar
 Manikandan R. Achari as Vava
 Sidhartha Siva as British Advicer 
 Aneesh G. Menon as Noor Ahmed
 Amith Chakalakkal as Mammad 
 Sadiq
 Mukundan
 Thesni Khan as Suhara's Mother
 Sunil Sukhada as Brahmin
 Sudheer Karamana as Naduvazhi / Nair leader
 M. S. Bhaskar as Mothalali
 Idavela Babu as Menon
 Jude Anthany Joseph as Brahmin
 Sudev Nair as Swathi Thirunal Rama Varma
 Riaz M T as Brahmin
 Padmaraj Ratheesh as Jootha Pillai, a trader
 Dwayin Wayanad as Kochunni 's Childhood
 Davia Mary as Suhra's Childhood
 Benison Wayanad as Outha Childhood Villain
 Nora Fatehi in a special appearance in the song "Nrithageethikalennum"

Production

Development
By late August 2016, Rosshan Andrrews confirmed via media outlets that he would be directing a film based on the life of Kerala's heroic outlaw Kayamkulam Kochunni, written by his regular collaborators Bobby & Sanjay and Nivin Pauly playing the title character, to be produced by Gokulam Gopalan. It is the second film based on Kayamkulam Kochunni after the 1966 film of the same name. Kayamkulam Kochunni was a real-life thief who lived in 19th century in the Central Travancore region. He is said to have stolen from the rich and gave to the poor like Robin Hood. The screenplay was written after a two-and-a-half-year research by an eight-member team. The script was rehashed three times. Kayamkulam Kochunni holds the subtitle "most dangerous man". According to Andrrews, the film would feature Kochunni's life before and after his transition as a thief, his survival attempts, romance, and the social structure during the time. It would also discuss several unanswered questions in his story. Since the appearance of present-day Kayamkulam, Alappuzha district has changed from the time of Kochunni, a Sri Lankan village was to be set as Kayamkulam in the film. Filming was then planned to commence by the beginning of 2017 in Sri Lanka, a few scenes were also planned in Kayamkulam. Andrrews also revealed that they have plans to dub and release the film in Tamil language. P. M. Satheesh was signed as the sound designer. Initially, they had talks with Santhosh Narayanan to compose the film's music.

Kayamkulam Kochunni is a period film set in the 1850s and 1860s in what is present-day Kerala. Bobby and Sanjay collected a large amount of information beyond what was already known through Kottarathil Sankunni's Aithihyamala and through hearsay. Sanjay said that the film focuses on Kochunni's relationships and friendship. Kochunni was a socialist thief, he fought against "unbelievable cruelty" over the caste system that prevailed during that time. The team went on location scouting in Sri Lanka in June 2017. In August, it was reported that the filming would begin on 10 September. Nivin started learning horse riding and Kalaripayattu in August, he had begun learning the basics earlier in the year. He also gained weight for the role. The script demanded the actors to be trained in Kalaripayattu. Apart from Nivin, actors Babu Antony and Sunny Wayne also underwent training. The training sessions were held at Andrrew's martial arts school in Kochi and went through September 2017. During pre-production, Andrrews created miniatures for every set to be used in the film. In early September, Nivin confirmed that the filming would commence in Udupi in a fortnight.

Casting
According to Andrrews, Nivin was their first and only choice for the role of Kochunni. The film traverse through multiple timelines in Kochunni's life. Nivin was selected for the role since Andrrews felt that he has a flexible body language that suits any role, among his generation of actors. According to Sanjay, Nivin's features matches Sankunni's descriptions of Kochunni in Aithihyamala. Andrrews briefed the film's story to Nivin along with the story of another film he plans to follow up after Kayamkulam Kochunni, to both Nivin agreed. In July 2017, a casting call was released for both males and females aged between 5–40. Amala Paul and Priyanka Thimmesh was confirmed before August 2017. Amala's character was said to be an important figure in Kochunni's life; Priyanka plays the role of Suhra, his wife. Babu Antony confirmed his role in September 2017 as Ithingal Thangal, the mentor of Kochunni.

In late 2017, Amala opted out from the film due to scheduling conflicts, who was replaced by Priya Anand. Andrrews said the rain affected their schedule and had to make changes, which conflicted with Amala's dates who had commitments in Tamil films. Priya cancelled three films for Kayamkulam Kochunni; she plays Janaki. According to Priya, Janaki's story is relevant to every woman. Wayne plays the character named Keshavan, who is well trained in Kalaripayattu. In early January 2018, Nivin and Andrrews announced that Mohanlal would appear in the film in the role of Ithikkara Pakki, a robber contemporary to Kochunni. In a February 2018 interview, Sanjay revealed that Mohanlal has 40 minutes screen time who appears at a particular juncture in the story, "we wished for someone of his stature to play this character. Pakki is Kochunni's contemporary and predecessor. It's Pakki who started the unique style of robbing and that's what Kochunni continued with". In March 2018, Nora Fatehi was confirmed to be appearing in a song sequence in the film, which also features Nivin. Choreographed by Vishnu Deva, it was shot in Goa in that month.

Filming
Principal photography commenced on 30 September 2017 in Udupi, Karnataka. In the first schedule the team filmed in locations such as Mangalore, Manjeshwar, and Udupi for two months. It was reported that the filming would move to Sri Lanka for the following schedule. Nivin trained in Kalaripayattu every morning before shoot under trainers from Kerala. He had a shot crop haircut and wears a handlebar moustache for the character of Kochunni. Filming was held in Kasaragod and Mangalore during November and December 2017. Large sets were created for the film. Binod Pradhan was the cinematographer. Mohanlal joined the sets in Mangalore on 13 February 2018 and began filming from the following day with the combination scenes between Ithikkara Pakki and Kochunni. The 161 days long filming was wrapped in Sri Lanka on 1 June 2018.

Three cinematographers worked in Kayamkulam Kochunni—Binod Pradhan, Nirav Shah, and Sudheer Palsane. Pradhan worked for 110 days after which the filming was delayed due to Nivin's injury and other reasons and Pradhan had to join Kalank due to prior commitment. Shah was the cinematographer for the next 40 days, who shot the climax and scenes in Goa. Palsane joined for the remaining 11 days for filming the scenes in Sri Lanka. Film's colour grading was done by Red Chillies Entertainment. Kayamkulam Kochunni was made on an average budget of 50 crore.

Music
The original soundtrack of the film was composed by Gopi Sundar and released by Eros Now. The lyrics for the songs were written by Shobin Kannangatt and Rafeeq Ahamed.

Release

Theatrical
Kayamkulam Kochunni was initially set to release on 15 August 2018, but was postponed for about a week due to delays in completing the post-production. Release was postponed again due to the August 2018 Kerala floods and was rescheduled and released on 11 October 2018.

Reception

Box office

India
Kayamkulam Kochunni was released in more than 350 screens in Kerala and screened 1700 shows in the first day, making it the largest movie release in the state. The film grossed 5.30 crore in the opening day from Kerala alone, the highest opening-day collection at Kerala box office. It grossed  67crore from the Worldwide box office.

Other territories
Kayamkulam Kochunni grossed $1,108,021 in the United Arab Emirates from 49 screens in the opening weekend—the best opener of that weekend, and earned $1,654,495 in four weeks. In the opening weekend, the film collected $70,319 (₹52.03 lakh) in the United States and NZ$21,191 (₹10.18 lakh) in New Zealand. Released on 26 October, the film debuted with £39,483 (₹37.19 lakh) in the opening weekend in the United Kingdom. It made $226,069 (₹1.65 crore) in the US in five weeks and £88,368 (₹83.2 lakh) in the UK in three weeks, and NZ$32,264 (₹15.61 lakh) in New Zealand in two weeks.

Accolades

References

External links
 

2018 films
2010s Malayalam-language films
Indian historical action films
2010s historical action films
Films set in the 19th century
Films set in the British Raj
History of Kerala on film
Films about highwaymen
Films with screenplays by Bobby-Sanjay
Films directed by Rosshan Andrrews